Virgil Neagoe (born 3 July 1970) is a Romanian ski jumper. He competed in the normal hill and large hill events at the 1992 Winter Olympics.

References

1970 births
Living people
Romanian male ski jumpers
Olympic ski jumpers of Romania
Ski jumpers at the 1992 Winter Olympics
Place of birth missing (living people)